Central Neo-Aramaic languages represent a specific group of Neo-Aramaic languages, that is designated as Central in reference to its geographical position between Western Neo-Aramaic and other Eastern Aramaic groups. Its linguistic homeland is located in northern parts of the historical region of Syria (modern southeastern Turkey and northeastern Syria). The group includes the Turoyo language as a spoken language of the Tur Abdin region and various groups in diaspora, and Mlahsô language that is recently extinct as a spoken language.

Within Aramaic studies, several alternative groupings of Neo-Aramaic languages had been proposed by different researchers, and some of those groupings have used the term Central Neo-Aramaic in a wider meaning, including the widest scope, referring to all Neo-Aramaic languages except for Western Neo-Aramaic and Neo-Mandaic.

Definition

The narrower definition of the term "Central Neo-Aramaic languages" includes only the Turoyo and Mlahsô languages, while the wider definition also includes the Northeastern Neo-Aramaic (NENA) group. In an attempt to avoid confusion, the narrower group is sometimes referred to as Northwestern Neo-Aramaic, and when combined with NENA it is called Northern Neo-Aramaic.

Both languages that are belonging to this group are termed as Syriac (ܣܘܪܝܝܐ Sūryoyo), and refer to the classical language as either Edessan (ܐܘܪܗܝܐ Ūrhoyo) or Literary (ܟܬܒܢܝܐ Kthobonoyo). The latter name is particularly used for the revived Classical Syriac.

Region
The smaller Central, or Northwestern, varieties of Neo-Aramaic are spoken by Assyrian Christians traditionally living in the Tur Abdin area of southeastern Turkey and areas around it. Turoyo itself is the closely related group of dialects spoken in Tur Abdin, while Mlahsô is an extinct language once spoken to the north, in Diyarbakır Province.

Other related languages all seem to now be extinct without record. A large number of speakers of these languages have moved to al-Jazira in Syria, particularly the towns of Qamishli and al Hasakah. A number of Turoyo speakers are found in diaspora, with a particularly prominent community in Sweden.

History
The Central Neo-Aramaic languages have a dual heritage. Most immediately, they have grown out of Eastern Aramaic colloquial varieties that were spoken in the Tur Abdin region and the surrounding plains for a thousand years. However, they have been influenced by Classical Syriac, which itself was the variety of Eastern Aramaic spoken farther west, in the Osroenian city of Edessa. Perhaps the proximity of Central Neo-Aramaic to Edessa, and the closeness of their parent languages, meant that they bear a greater similarity to the classical language than do Northeastern Neo-Aramaic varieties.

However, a clearly separate evolution can be seen in Turoyo and Mlahsô. Mlahsô is grammatically similar to the classical language, and continued to use a similar tense-aspect system to it. However, Mlahsô developed a distinctively clipped phonological palette and systematically turns /θ/→/s/. On the other hand, Turoyo has a quite similar phonology to Classical Syriac, yet it has developed a radically different grammar, sharing similar features with NENA varieties.

First modern studies of Central Neo-Aramaic dialects were initiated during the 19th century, and by the beginning of the 20th century some attempts were made to expand the use of vernacular (Turoyo) into the literary sphere, still dominated by the prolonged use of Classical Syriac among educated adherents of the Syriac Orthodox Church. That development was interrupted by the breakout of the First World War (1914-1918) and the atrocities committed during Seyfo (genocide) against various Aramaic-speaking communities, including those in the Tur Abdin region. Displacement of local Christian communities from their native regions created several new groups of Turoyo speakers throughout diaspora. Those events had a long-lasting impact on future development of Turoyo-speaking communities, affecting all spheres of their life, including culture, language and literature.

See also

References

Sources

 
 
 
 
 
 
 
 
 
 
 
 
 
 
 
 
 
  
 
 
 
 
 
 
 
 
 
 

Eastern Aramaic languages
Languages of Kurdistan
Neo-Aramaic languages